Acrocercopinae is a subfamily of moths described by Akito Yuji Kawahara and Issei Ohshima in 2016.

Genera
In alphabetical order:
Acrocercops Wallengren, 1881
Amblyptila Vári, 1961
Artifodina Kumata, 1985
Borboryctis Kumata & Kuroko, 1988
Chilocampyla Busck, 1900
Chrysocercops Kumata & Kuroko, 1988
Corethrovalva Vári, 1961
Cryptolectica Vári, 1961
Dekeidoryxis Kumata, 1989
Deoptilia Kumata & Kuroko, 1988
Dialectica Walsingham, 1897
Eteoryctis Kumata & Kuroko, 1988
Eucosmophora Walsingham, 1897
Gibbovalva Kumata & Kuroko, 1988
Hypectopa Diakonoff, 1955
Lamprolectica Vári, 1961
Leucocercops Vári, 1961
Melanocercops Kumata & Kuroko, 1988
Leucospilapteryx Spuler, 1910
Metacercops Vári, 1961
Monocercops Kumata, 1989
Phodoryctis Kumata & Kuroko, 1988
Psydrocercops Kumata & Kuroko, 1988
Sauterina Kuznetzov, 1979
Schedocercops Vári, 1961
Spulerina Vári, 1961
Telamoptilia Kumata & Kuroko, 1988
Vihualpenia Mundaca, Parra & Vargas, 2013

References

 
Moth subfamilies